Kalwar (Post Office Kaalwaad)  is a village in Jhotwara Mandal in Jaipur District, Rajasthan, India. Kalwar is 18 km distance from its Mandal Main Town Jhotwara, and 22.8 km distance from its District Main City Jaipur. And 24 km distance from its State Main City Jaipur.

References

Villages in Jaipur district